Miyakinsky District (Miäkä rayonı; , Miyakä rayonı) is an administrative and municipal district (raion), one of the fifty-four in the Republic of Bashkortostan, Russia. It is located in the west of the republic and borders with Alsheyevsky District in the north, Sterlitamaksky District in the east, Sterlibashevsky District in the east and south, Orenburg Oblast in the southwest, and with Bizhbulyaksky District in the west. Its administrative center is the rural locality (a selo) of Kirgiz-Miyaki. As of the 2010 Census, the total population of the district was 28,224, with the population of Kirgiz-Miyaki accounting for 26.5% of that number.

History
The district was established on August 20, 1930 as Kirgiz-Miyakinsky District. On February 20, 1932, parts of the district were transferred to Aurgazinsky, Davlekanovsky, Karagushevsky, and Sterlitamaksky Districts; at the same time, three villages in Davlekanovsky District were appended to Kirgiz-Miyakinsky District. On January 31, 1935, a major part of the district was split among other districts and the remaining territory was renamed Miyakinsky District. One selsoviet was transferred to Aznayevsky District in 1940 and another one to Bizhbulyaksky District in 1947. On May 7, 1953, two rural localities were transferred to Sterlibashevsky District, and on June 4, 1953, one rural locality was transferred to Miyakinsky District from Bizhbulyaksky District. On February 1, 1963, Miyakinsky District was merged into Alsheyevsky District, but this was reversed on January 13, 1965. The external borders of the district have remained unchanged ever since.

Administrative and municipal status
Within the framework of administrative divisions, Miyakinsky District is one of the fifty-four in the Republic of Bashkortostan. The district is divided into fifteen selsoviets, comprising ninety-six rural localities. As a municipal division, the district is incorporated as Miyakinsky Municipal District. Its fifteen selsoviets are incorporated as fifteen rural settlements within the municipal district. The selo of Kirgiz-Miyaki serves as the administrative center of both the administrative and municipal district.

References

Notes

Sources

Districts of Bashkortostan
States and territories established in 1930
States and territories disestablished in 1963
States and territories established in 1965